Prince Saydee is a Liberian footballer who currently plays for Hartford Athletic in the USL Championship.

Club career
After spending his early years in his native Liberia, Saydee spent time on trial with Slovakian side Slovan Bratislava in 2016. In 2019, Saydee joined Atlanta SC in the United States. In January 2020, Saydee joined USL Championship side Miami FC. Saydee was signed by Phoenix Rising FC on 4 January 2021.

On 19 January 2022, Saydee signed for USL Championship club Hartford Athletic.

International career
Saydee was called up to the Liberian national team for a series of World Cup qualifying matches in 2013, making his debut on 7 September 2013 against Angola.

References

External links
 
 
 

1996 births
Living people
Liberian footballers
Liberia international footballers

Association football midfielders
National Independent Soccer Association players
USL Championship players
Barrack Young Controllers FC players
Atlanta Silverbacks players
Liberian expatriate footballers
Liberian expatriate sportspeople in the United States
Expatriate soccer players in the United States
Miami FC players
Phoenix Rising FC players
Hartford Athletic players
Place of birth missing (living people)